"Cooped Up" is a song by American rapper and singer Post Malone featuring fellow American rapper and singer Roddy Ricch. It was released through Mercury Records and Republic Records on May 12, 2022, as the second single from Malone's fourth studio album, Twelve Carat Toothache (2022).

Music video
The music video, directed by Andre Bato, was released on May 18, 2022.

Live performances
On May 14, 2022, he appeared as a musical guest on Saturday Night Live and performed "Cooped Up" with Ricch.

Personnel 
Credits adapted from Tidal and Genius.

 Post Malone – vocals, songwriting, drums
 Roddy Ricch – vocals, songwriting
 Louis Bell – songwriting, production, recording engineering, vocal production, keyboards, synthesizer, programming, drums
 Billy Walsh – songwriting

Charts

Weekly charts

Year-end charts

Certifications

References

External links
  
 

2022 songs
2022 singles
Post Malone songs
Mercury Records singles
Republic Records singles
Roddy Ricch songs
Songs written by Post Malone
Songs written by Roddy Ricch
Songs written by Louis Bell
Song recordings produced by Louis Bell

Pop-rap songs
Song recordings produced by Post Malone